The Poland women's national under-18 and under-19 basketball team is a national basketball team of Poland, administered by the Polski Zwiazek Koszykówki.
It represents the country in women's international under-18 and under-19 (under age 18 and under age 19) basketball competitions.

See also
Poland women's national basketball team
Poland women's national under-17 basketball team
Poland men's national under-19 basketball team

References

External links
Archived records of Poland team participations

under
Women's national under-19 basketball teams